UBX domain-containing protein 11 is a protein that in humans is encoded by the UBXN11 gene.

Function 

This gene encodes a protein with a divergent C-terminal UBX domain. The homologous protein in the rat interacts with members of the Rnd subfamily of Rho GTPases at the cell periphery through its C-terminal region. It also interacts with several heterotrimeric G proteins through their G-alpha subunits and promotes Rho GTPase activation. It is proposed to serve a bidirectional role in the promotion and inhibition of Rho activity through upstream signaling pathways. The 3' coding sequence of this gene contains a polymorphic region of 24 nt tandem repeats. Several transcripts containing between 1.5 and five repeat units have been reported. Multiple transcript variants encoding different isoforms have been found for this gene.

Interactions 

UBXD5 has been shown to interact with Rnd1, Rnd2 and Rnd3.

References

Further reading